The Connacht Intermediate Club Hurling Championship is an annual club competition in Connacht. Prior to 2008, county champions competed in the senior grade, but since then the senior champions from Mayo and Roscommon compete at intermediate level along with the Galway intermediate champions, who receive a bye to the final. The winners go on to compete for the All-Ireland Intermediate Club Hurling Championship.

Beginning with the 2018 championship, the London champions compete in the competition, entering at the semi-final stage. The competition has been won by the Galway representatives on each occasion, with the exception of Mayo club Tooreen's wins in 2017, 2019 & 2021.

Teams

Recent championships

2021

2019

2018

2017

2016

2015

2014

2013

List of Finals

Roll of Honour

Wins by Club

Wins by County

See also
 Munster Intermediate Club Hurling Championship
 Leinster Intermediate Club Hurling Championship
 Ulster Intermediate Club Hurling Championship

References

2